Eugène Manet (21 November 1833 – 13 April 1892) was a French painter.  He did not achieve the high reputation of his older brother Édouard Manet or his wife Berthe Morisot, and devoted much of his efforts to supporting his wife's career.

Manet was the middle of the three sons of Auguste Manet, an official at the French Ministry of Justice.  He was born in Paris, 22 months after his older brother Édouard in January 1832, and 16 months before his younger brother Gustave in March 1835.  He was named after his mother Eugénie-Désirée (née Fournier).  The brothers Édouard and Eugène took piano lessons from Suzanne Leenhoff from 1849; she eventually married Édouard in 1863.

Eugéne served in the French Army, and then studied law, but did not follow his father into a legal career.   He travelled to Italy with Édouard in 1853 to study Old Master paintings in Florence, Venice, and Rome.

Berthe Morisot developed a close relationship with Édouard Manet from 1868, but Édouard remained married to his wife Suzanne, and, instead, Berthe married Édouard's brother Eugène in Passy on 22 December 1874 (sometimes described as a marriage of convenience).  Their wedding gift from Edgar Degas was a portrait of Eugène Manet.  Manet and Morisot had one daughter, Julie Manet, born on 14 November 1878.

Manet was depicted by his brother in his paintings Music in the Tuileries (1862), and was probably a model for the right male figure in Le Déjeuner sur l’herbe  (1863) which has been identified as either Eugène or his dark-haired younger brother Gustave Manet, and may be a composite of the two.  Eugène may also be the chiffonnier (rag-picker) to the right in his brother's painting Philosophers of 1865, and was depicted with Édouard's wife Suzanne in On the Beach (1873).  He was also painted several times by his wife.

Like his brother Édouard, Eugène had Republican political sympathies.  He published a semi-autobiographical novel, "Victimes!", in 1889. He suffered from ill health from 1891 and died in Paris the following year.  He was survived by his wife and daughter; Morisot herself died in 1895.  His older brother Édouard had died in 1883 and his younger brother Gustave in 1884.

References
 Manet and the Family Romance, Nancy Locke, p. 54–56

1833 births
1892 deaths
19th-century French painters
Édouard Manet
Artists from Paris
French Army soldiers